The Dutch National Road Race Championships take place annually, on the weekend prior to the start of the Tour de France. First held in 1888, today it is organized by the Top Sports Group, commissioned by the KNWU.

Men

Until 1927, the race was open for all categories, after 1927 only for professional cyclists with or without contract.

Elite

U23

Women

See also

Dutch National Time Trial Championships
National road cycling championships

Notes

References 

National road cycling championships
Cycle races in the Netherlands
Dutch National Road Race Championships (women)